Element Eighty is an American nu metal band from Tyler, Texas, formed in 2000. The band split in 2006, only to be reunited a few months later in 2007. Their first album was named after the chemical element mercury, which has number eighty in the Periodic Table of the Elements.

History 
Element Eighty formed in 1998 and self-released their debut album Mercuric in June 2001 through Pale Star Records. In April 2003, the band signed a deal with Universal/Republic Records. Their self-titled album Element Eighty was released in October 2003. The band toured with such artists as Sevendust, Mudvayne, 3 Doors Down, Slipknot, Shinedown, Korn, Hellyeah, Ill Niño, Flaw, 40 Below Summer and Mushroomhead. The song "Broken Promises" was featured on the Need for Speed: Underground video game soundtrack. The song also peaked at No. 36 on the U.S. Mainstream Rock charts.

After several months of touring, the band could see that their label had no interest in pushing the band – there was no music video or any kind of promotion. The band would later split with Universal/Republic late 2004. Soon after their departure, original bassist Roon decided to leave the band to attend college and later graduate study in biomedical research. He was later replaced by Zack Bates, formerly of the band Bullet Ant.

The band released their third album The Bear in November 2005, via their own label, Texas Cries Records. The album was only made available through the band's official website, at shows, and digital distribution/streaming.

Element Eighty has reunited in 2021 after reluctantly disbanding in 2009 due to overwhelming life circumstances. After they parted ways, all members continued on their own musical journeys; steady gigging with a variety of successful acts and solo projects. After a 12-year-silence, Element Eighty decided that 2021 was time for a full relaunch and began working on a new album slated for release in 2023. They released a new version of their song "Ego" on December 3, 2021, and released the new single "Mountain" on September 9, 2022.

Members 
Current lineup
 David Galloway – vocals (1998–2010, 2021–present)
 Matt Woods – guitars (1998–2010, 2021–present)
 Zack Bates – bass (2005–2010, 2021–present)
 Ryan Carroll – drums (1998–2010, 2021–present)

Former members
 Roon – bass (1998–2005)

Discography

References

External links 

 Official website
 Element Eighty on Facebook
 Element Eighty on Spotify
 Element Eighty on Instagram
 Element Eighty on Last.fm

American nu metal musical groups
American post-hardcore musical groups
Heavy metal musical groups from Texas
Musical groups established in 2000
Musical groups disestablished in 2006
Musical groups reestablished in 2007
Musical groups disestablished in 2010
Musical groups reestablished in 2021